Parklands is a residential locality in the local government area (LGA) of Burnie in the North-west and west LGA region of Tasmania. The 2016 census recorded a population of 850 for the state suburb of Parklands.
It is a suburb of the Burnie, in north-west Tasmania.

The visitor information centre for Burnie is called The Makers' Workshop and is a place that honours Burnie's history, makers, innovators and artists. It highlights paper making and cheese making through workshops and has a gallery and cafe.

The Burnie War Memorial commemorates the fallen soldiers of the Great War.

Burnie Park has plenty of lush green lawns and ideal for picnics. It has a children' playground, waterfall and a music shell as some of its features.

The North West Regional Hospital is located on Brickport Road, Parklands.

History 
Parklands was gazetted as a locality in 1966.

Geography
The waters of Bass Strait form the northern boundary.

Road infrastructure
Route A2 (Bass Highway) runs through from north-east to north-west.

Education 
Marist Regional College Est. 1972

References

External links 
North West Regional Hospital
Marist Regional College
visitor information centre

Suburbs of Burnie, Tasmania